Ceromonies is a three-disc DVD and CD set from Fields of the Nephilim, featuring footage recorded July 12 and 13, 2008, at London’s Shepherds Bush Empire. It was released in April 2012. "Ceromonies" is an intentional misspelling; the dates were chosen in honour of the anniversary of the birth of John Dee, Queen Elizabeth I’s astrologer. The word also refers to the word "zero" in other languages.

Track listing

Members 
 Carl McCoy - Vocals
 John ‘Capachino’ Carter - Bass Guitar
 Tom Edwards - Guitar (Deceased)
 Gav King - Guitar
 Lee Newell - Drums

References

2012 live albums
2012 video albums
Live video albums
Live gothic rock albums